Mulamuttal is a village in Dharwad district of Karnataka, India.

Demographics 
As of the 2011 Census of India there were 433 households in Mulamuttal and a total population of 2,081 consisting of 1,065 males and 1,016 females. There were 264 children ages 0-6.

References

Villages in Dharwad district